Scopula stenoptera is a moth of the  family Geometridae. It is found in Peru.

References

Moths described in 1922
stenoptera
Moths of South America